Couthures-sur-Garonne is a commune in the Lot-et-Garonne department, southwestern France.

See also
Communes of the Lot-et-Garonne department

References

Couthuressurgaronne